Kenneth Wade,  (1932–2014) was a British chemist and professor emeritus at Durham University.

Early life and education 
Kenneth Wade was born in Sleaford on 13 October 1932, the second son of Harry Kennington Wade and his wife, Anna Elizabeth Wade. He was educated at Carre's Grammar School, and graduated from the University of Nottingham as the first PhD student (1954–1957) of Norman Greenwood, and Cornell University.

Career 
After spending two years as a post-doctoral student at the University of Cambridge and two further years lecturing successively at Cornell University and Derby College of Technology, in 1961 Wade became a Lecturer at Durham University. In 1971, he was appointed Senior Lecturer and was promoted to Reader in 1977. Between 1983 and 1998, he was Professor of Chemistry at the university and served, between 1986 and 1989, as Chairman of its Department of Chemistry.

Wade's Rules, also known as Polyhedral skeletal electron pair theory, are a set of electron counting rules to predict the shapes of borane clusters.

Awards
1982: Main Group Award, Royal Society of Chemistry.
1999: Tilden Prize, Royal Society of Chemistry.
1989: Fellow, Royal Society.
1999: Ludwig Mond Award, Royal Society of Chemistry.
2012: Chancellor's Medal, University of Durham.

References

External links
"Collection of articles dedicated to Professor Ken Wade, F.R.S. in celebration of his seventy-fifth birthday", Dalton Transactions, 3 April 2008

British chemists
1932 births
2014 deaths
Fellows of the Royal Society
Academics of Durham University
Alumni of the University of Nottingham
People educated at Carre's Grammar School
Cornell University alumni